In mathematics, Minkowski's theorem is the statement that every convex set in  which is symmetric with respect to the origin and which has volume greater than  contains a non-zero integer point (meaning a point in  that is not the origin). The theorem was proved by Hermann Minkowski in 1889 and became the foundation of the branch of number theory called the geometry of numbers.

Formulation
(Since the set  is symmetric, it would then contain at least three lattice points: the origin 0 and a pair of points , where .)

Example
The simplest example of a lattice is the integer lattice  of all points with integer coefficients; its determinant is 1. For , the theorem claims that a convex figure in the Euclidean plane symmetric about the origin and with area greater than 4 encloses at least one lattice point in addition to the origin. The area bound is sharp: if  is the interior of the square with vertices  then  is symmetric and convex, and has area 4, but the only lattice point it contains is the origin. This example, showing that the bound of the theorem is sharp, generalizes to hypercubes in every dimension .

Proof

Proof of the  case: Consider the map

Intuitively, this map cuts the plane into 2 by 2 squares, then stacks the squares on top of each other. Clearly  has area less than or equal to 4, because this set lies within a 2 by 2 square. Assume for a contradiction that  could be injective, which means the pieces of  cut out by the squares stack up in a non-overlapping way.

Because of the way  was defined, the only way that  can equal  is for 
That is, the coordinates of the two points differ by two even integers. 
In other words,

Therefore,  contains a nonzero integer point.

Remarks:  
 The argument above proves the theorem that any set of volume  contains two distinct points that differ by a lattice vector. This is a special case of Blichfeldt's theorem.
 The argument above highlights that the term  is the covolume of the lattice .

Applications

Bounding the shortest vector

Minkowski's theorem gives an upper bound for the length of the shortest nonzero vector. This result has applications in lattice cryptography and number theory. 

Theorem (Minkowski's bound on the shortest vector): Let   be a lattice.

Remarks: 

The optimal constant is known as the Hermite constant.
 Even though Minkowski's theorem guarantees a short lattice vector within a certain magnitude bound, finding this vector is in general a hard computational problem. Finding the vector within a factor guaranteed by Minkowski's bound is referred to as Minkowski's Vector Problem (MVP), and it is known that approximation SVP reduces to it using transference properties of the dual lattice. The computational problem is also sometimes referred to as HermiteSVP.
 The LLL-basis reduction algorithm can be seen as a weak but efficiently algorithmic version of Minkowski's bound on the shortest vector. This is because a -LLL reduced basis  for  has the property that ; see these lecture notes of Micciancio for more on this. As explained in, proofs of bounds on the Hermite constant contain some of the key ideas in the LLL-reduction algorithm.

Applications to number theory

Primes that are sums of two squares
The difficult implication in Fermat's theorem on sums of two squares can be proven using Minkowski's bound on the shortest vector. 

Theorem: Every prime with  can be written as a sum of two squares.

Additionally, the lattice perspective gives a computationally efficient approach to Fermat's theorem on sums of squares:
Such vectors can be found efficiently, for instance using LLL-algorithm. In particular, if  is a -LLL reduced basis, then, by the property that , .

Lagrange's four-square theorem
Minkowski's theorem is also useful to prove Lagrange's four-square theorem, which states that every natural number can be written as the sum of the squares of four natural numbers.

Dirichlet's theorem on simultaneous rational approximation

Minkowski's theorem can be used to prove Dirichlet's theorem on simultaneous rational approximation.

Algebraic number theory

Complexity theory

The complexity of finding the point guaranteed by Minkowski's theorem, or the closely related Blichfeldt's theorem, have been studied from the perspective of TFNP search problems. In particular, it is known that a computational analogue of Blichfeldt's theorem, a corollary of the proof of Minkowski's theorem, is PPP-complete. It is also known that the computational analogue of Minkowski's theorem is in the class PPP, and it was conjectured to be PPP complete.

See also
 Danzer set
 Pick's theorem
 Dirichlet's unit theorem
 Minkowski's second theorem
 Ehrhart's volume conjecture

Further reading

 ([1996 with minor corrections])
 Wolfgang M. Schmidt.Diophantine approximations and Diophantine equations, Lecture Notes in Mathematics, Springer Verlag 2000.

External links
Stevenhagen, Peter. Number Rings.

References

Geometry of numbers
Convex analysis
Theorems in number theory
Articles containing proofs
Hermann Minkowski